Joey Fimmano is an Australian musician and entertainer.

Career
Joey Fimmano was just four when his grandfather inspired him to pick up the piano accordion for the first time.

Fimmano's career began in 1978 where he appeared on Young Talent Time. From there, Fimmano went on to be a regular on TV daytime shows during the 1980s and 90s.

Discography

Albums

Awards

Mo Awards
The Australian Entertainment Mo Awards (commonly known informally as the Mo Awards), were annual Australian entertainment industry awards. They recognise achievements in live entertainment in Australia from 1975 to 2016. Fimmano won 11 awards in that time.
 (wins only)
|-
| 1994
| Joey Fimmano
| Vocal/Instrumenal Performer of the Year 
| 
|-
| 1995
| Joey Fimmano
| Vocal/Instrumenal Performer of the Year 
| 
|-
| 1996
| Joey Fimmano
| Vocal/Instrumenal Performer of the Year 
| 
|-
| 2006
| Joey Fimmano
| Instrumental or Vocal Performer of the Year 
| 
|-
| 2007
| Joey Fimmano
| Instrumental or Vocal Performer of the Year 
| 
|-
| 2008
| Joey Fimmano
| Instrumental or Vocal Performer of the Year 
| 
|-
| 2012
| Joey Fimmano
| International Theme Show/Performer of the Year 
| 
|-

References 

Living people
Australian male actors
Australian musicians
Year of birth missing (living people)